Mills is an English and Scottish occupational surname. Mill workers or owners of one or more mills would have received the name, through being called John the worker of the mills, or Joe the owner of the mills until it was shortened to simply John or Joe Mills. Notable people with the surname include:

A
Aaron Mills (born 1972), American football player
Adrian Mills (born 1956), British television presenter
Alan Mills (disambiguation), multiple people including:
Alan Mills (baseball) (born 1966), American baseball player
Alan Mills (musician) (1913–1977), British songwriter
Alan Mills (tennis), British tennis player and referee
Alec Mills (born 1991), American baseball player
Alexandria Mills (born 1992), American model
Alexander Rud Mills (1885–1964), Australian Odinic religious author and lecturer
Alice Mills (born 1986), Australian swimmer
Alice du Pont Mills (1912–2002), American aviator and race-horse breeder
Allison "Alley" Mills (born 1951), American actress
 Angela Mills or Angela Kincaid, British children's book illustrator
Ann Mills, British woman of the eighteenth century, was a disguised sailor
Annette Mills (1894–1955), British dancer, actress and broadcaster

B
Barbara Mills (1940–2011), British barrister and public servant
Barry Mills (disambiguation), multiple people
Beatrice Mills, (1883–1972), American-born Countess of Granard
Ben Mills (born 1980), British singer
Bernard Mills (1920–2011), Australian astronomer
Bertram Mills (1873–1938), British circus owner
Bill Mills (1919–2019), Major League Baseball player
Billy Mills (1898–1937), South African racing driver
Billy Mills (born 1938), American distance runner
Billy Mills (born 1954), Irish poet
Billy G. Mills (born 1929), American politician and judge
Bob Mills (born 1957), British comedian and radio presenter
Bob Mills (born 1941), Canadian politician
Brad Mills (born 1957), American baseball player and coach
Brad Mills (born 1985), American baseball player
Bradley Mills (born 1983), Canadian ice hockey player
Brian Mills (born 1971), English footballer
Brian Mills, British television director

C
C. Wright Mills (1916–1962), American sociologist
Caleb Mills (1806–1879), American educator
Charles Mills (disambiguation), multiple people
Charlie Mills (1844–1874), American baseball player
Charlie Mills (1888–1972), German harness racing driver and trainer
Chris Mills (born 1970), American basketball player
Clark Mills (1915–2001), American boat builder and designer
Clark Mills (1810–1883), American sculptor
Colin Mills (educationalist) (born 1951), British educationalist
Colin Mills (sociologist), British sociologist
Crispian Mills (born 1973), British musician (Kula Shaker)

D
Damian Mills (1979–2003), Canadian cricketer
Darby Mills, Canadian singer
Darius Ogden Mills (1825–1910), American banker and philanthropist
Danny Mills (born 1977), British footballer
David Mills (disambiguation), multiple people
Davis Mills (born 1998), American football player
Dennis Mills (born 1946), Canadian businessman and politician
Derek Mills, American Olympic runner
Dick Mills, British sound engineer and electronic composer
Donna Mills (born 1940), American actress
Dizzee Rascal, British musician – real name Dylan Mills

E
E. C. Mills (1873–1962), American educator
Edwin Mills (disambiguation), multiple people, including:
Edwin Mills (actor), American actor in Return to the Planet of the Apes
Edwin Mills (athlete) (1878–1946), British tug-of-war competitor
Edwin Mills (economist) (born 1928), American economist
Eleri Mills (born 1955), Welsh artist
Elijah H. Mills (1776–1829), American politician
Elle Mills (born 1998), Canadian YouTuber
Enoch J. Mills (1878–1935), American college sports coach
Everett Mills (1845–1908), American baseball player

F
Florence Mills (1896–1927), African American cabaret singer, dancer, and comedian
Frances Jones Mills (1920–1996), Kentucky politician
Frank Mills, Canadian musician
Freddie Mills (1919–1965), British boxer

G
Garrett Mills, American football player
Gary Mills (disambiguation), multiple people, including:
Gary Mills (footballer, born 1961), English footballer and manager
Gary Mills (footballer, born 1981), English footballer
Garry Mills, British pop singer
George Mills (footballer) (1908–1970), English footballer
George Mills (RAF officer) (1902–1971), British Air Chief Marshal
Gladys Mills, known as 'Mrs Mills', (1918–1978), English pianist
Glady Mills (1883–1970), American racehorse owner/breeder
Gord Mills (1928–2004), Canadian politician

H
Harlan Mills (1919–1996), American computer scientist
Harriet Cornelia Mills (1920–2016), China scholar
Harriet May Mills (1857–1936), civil rights leader
Hayley Mills (born 1946), British actress
Heather Mills (born 1968), second wife of Sir Paul McCartney
Howard Mills, American politician
Hannah Mills, (born 1988), British (Welsh) Olympic sailor
Hugh Brooks Mills, American businessman and politician
Hugh Mills (rugby union) (1873–1905), New Zealand rugby union player

I
Iain Mills, British politician
Irving Mills (1894–1985), jazz figure

J 
Jack Mills (1905–1970), British train driver
Jacquelyn Mills, Canadian documentary filmmaker
James Mills (disambiguation), multiple people
Jane Mills, Australian-New Zealand academic
Jay Mills (born 1961), US American football coach
Jeff Mills (born 1963), American DJ and music producer
Jeff Mills (born 1968), US American football player
Jerry Mills (1951–1993), American cartoonist
Jill Mills (born 1972), American strongwoman
Jim Mills (disambiguation), multiple people
John Mills (disambiguation), multiple people
John Archibald Mills (1910-1986), Canadian politician
Joseph Trotter Mills (1811–1897), American politician and jurist
Joshua Mills (disambiguation), multiple people
Judson Mills (born 1969), American actor
Juliet Mills (born 1941), British character actress
June Mills, Australian singer and musician, daughter of Kathy Mills

K
Kathy Mills, (1935–2022), Australian community leader, singer, Aboriginal elder and activist 
Kerry Mills (1869–1948), American composer
Kyle Mills (born 1979), New Zealand cricketer
Kyle Mills (author) (born 1966), American author

L
Lawrence Heyworth Mills (1837–1918), American orientalist
Leonard Myles-Mills (born 1973), Ghanaian sprinter
Les Mills (born 1934), New Zealand Olympic athlete
Leslie Mills, American singer, songwriter, record producer, and actress
Liz Mills, Australian basketball coach

M
Magnus Mills (born 1954), English author
Mark Muir Mills (1917–1958), American nuclear physicist
Mary Mills (born 1940), American golfer
Mary Mills (born 1964), American opera singer
Matthew Mills, English footballer
May Mills (1890–1984), Australian sports administrator and educator.
Mick Mills (born 1949), British footballer
Mike Mills (born 1958), American musician and composer, bass guitar player for R.E.M.
Mike Mills (director) (born 1966), American director
 Mildred Mills or Mildred May Gostling (1873–1962), English chemist
Miles E. Mills (1891–1972), American politician
Miriam Mills (1938–1992), professor of public policy

N
 Nat Mills (1900–1993), English entertainer as one half of Nat Mills and Bobbie
Nicholas Mills (1781–1862), American businessman
Noam Mills (born 1986), female Israeli Olympic fencer

O
Ogden Mills (financier) (1857–1929), American businessman, father of Ogden L.
Ogden L. Mills (1884–1937), American Secretary of the Treasury and Congressman
Ossian Everett Mills, American fraternity founder

P
Pat Mills (born 1949), British cartoonist
Pat Mills (director) (born c. 1980), Canadian film director and actor
Patty Mills (born 1988), Australian men's basketball player
Paul Mills (disambiguation), multiple people
Pauline Mills McGibbon (1910–2001), Canadian politician
Pete Mills (born 1942), American football player
Peter Mills (disambiguation), multiple people, including:
Peter Mills (born 1943), American politician from Maine
Peter Mills (1921–1993), British Conservative Member of Paraliament for Devon West
Phil Mills (born 1963), Welsh rally co-driver
 Philip Mills (1952–1991), Australian drag queen, Doris Fish stage name
Phoebe Mills (born 1972), American gymnast and athlete

R
Randell Mills, American chemist and developer of the hydrino theory
Reginald Mills (1912–1990), British film editor
Richard Mills (disambiguation), multiple people
Rob Mills (born 1982), Australian pop singer
Robert Mills (disambiguation), multiple people including: 
Robert Mills (1781–1855), American architect
Robert Mills (1927–1999), American physicist
Robert Lee Mills (died 2006), former president of Georgetown College (Kentucky)
Robert P. Mills (1920–1986), American crime and science fiction magazine editor
Roger George Mills (born 1948), English race walker
Roger Q. Mills (1832–1911), American politician
Ron Mills (1938–2015), former Australian rules footballer
Ron Mills (Ronald A. Mills), Canadian curler
Royce Mills (1942–2019), English actor
Russell Mills (1892–1959), American architect
Russell Mills (born 1944), Canadian journalist and publisher
Russell Mills (born 1952), British artist, designed Pingu cartoons for CBBC

S
Sam Mills (1959–2005), US American football player
Samuel John Mills (1783–1818), American preacher
Samuel Sylvester Mills (1806–1874), Canadian businessman and member of the Senate of Canada
Samuel Mills (footballer), English footballer
Scott Mills (born 1973), British DJ
Stephanie Anne Mills (born 1979), Canadian voice actress
Stephanie Mills (born 1957), African-American singer
Stephanie Mills (All in the Family), fictional TV character
Stephen Mills, Artistic director Ballet Austin
Steve Mills (disambiguation), multiple people including:
Steve Mills (1953–1988), English footballer with Southampton
Steve Mills, (born 1951), English international rugby union player
Steve Mills,(born 1957), a juggler and unicyclist from New Jersey
Steve Mills, a fictional character on the New Zealand soap opera Shortland Street
Susan Tolman Mills (1825–1912), American co-founder and first president of Mills College

T
Tarpe Mills (1915–1988), American comic book writer whose real name was June Mills
Terry Mills (disambiguation), multiple people
Therese Mills (1928–2014), Trinidadian journalist
Thomas Mills (disambiguation), multiple people
Tommy Mills (c. 1883–1944), American athlete, coach, and administrator
Tony Mills (physician), American physician
Tony Mills (musician) (1962–2019), English musician, member of the bands Shy, TNT
Tymal Mills (born 1992), English cricketer

V
Viscount Mills British title in the Peerage of the United Kingdom

W
Walter Mills (disambiguation), multiple people
Wayne Mills, British soldier
Wayne Mills (1969–2013), American country musician
Wilbur Mills (1909–1992), American politician
William Mills (1750–1820), British politician
William Mills (1820–1877), British lawyer and cricketer
William Mills (1846–1917), Canadian Anglican bishop
William Mills (1856–1932), British inventor of the Mills bomb
William Augustus Mills (1777–1844), American major-general in the War of 1812
William Corless Mills (1860–1928), American museum curator
W. G. Mills (1859–1933), sheep breeder and politician in South Australia
William Hemingway Mills (1834-1918), British civil engineer known for polychromatic brick style
William Hobson Mills (1873–1959), British organic chemist
William J. Mills (1849–1915), Governor of New Mexico Territory
William O. Mills (1924–1973), American politician
William Thomas Mills (1924–2011), Canadian politician
Willie Mills (1877–1914), American baseball player
Willie Mills (1915–1991), Scottish footballer
Wyatt Mills (1995 born), American baseball player

Z
Zack Mills, American football coach

Fictional characters
 Bryan Mills, the lead character in the Taken film series, portrayed by Liam Neeson
 Detective Mills, played by Brad Pitt, in Seven (1995 film)
 Henry Daniel Mills, character in ABC TV show Once Upon A Time

See also

Justice Mills (disambiguation)
Mills Sisters, a singing group from the Torres Strait Islands

External links 
 
 Mills yDNA Project

English-language surnames